Psiathovalva is a genus of moths belonging to the family Tortricidae.

Species
Psiathovalva spinacea Razowski, 1994

See also
List of Tortricidae genera

References

 , 1994: Cochylini of Brazil (Lepidoptera: Tortricidae). Shilap Revista de Lepidopterologia 22: 19–49.

External links
tortricidae.com

Euliini
Tortricidae genera